Järntorget is a tram stop located in the square of Järntorget in Gothenburg, Sweden. It has 4 platforms, the left one is served by lines 1 and 6. The line 2 cuts Järntorget via Handelshögskolan. The left one is for trams going via Linnéplatsen. The right one is for going via Stigbergstorget and is served by lines 3, 9 and 11. It is an important interchange, even if it is not served by line 2.

Tram stops in Sweden